The Next Pakistani Senate election is scheduled to be held by March 2024. 52 out of 100 incumbent Senators including 4 FATA senators will Retire after completing their 6 year terms. After the merger of FATA with Khyber Pakhtunkhwa, the remaining 4 out of 8 seats will also be abolished. 48 seats from four Provinces and the Federal Capital will be up for election.

Background 
The previous Senate elections were held on 3 March 2018. As a result of these elections, Pakistan Tehreek-e-Insaf (PTI) became the largest party in the Senate as it won the most seats, securing 18 of the 48 senate seats up for election; of which 10 came from Khyber Pakhtunkhwa, 5 from Punjab, 2 from Sindh, and one from Islamabad. The Pakistan Peoples Party (PPP) came in second by winning 8 seats, of which 7 were won in Sindh and one in Islamabad. The Balochistan Awami Party (BAP) was declared victorious on 6 seats - all from Balochistan. Finally, the Pakistan Muslim League (N) lost its majority in the Senate as it could only manage 5 seats from Punjab against 16 retiring senators.

After the results were declared, much of the focus was on the Islamabad General seat won by PPP's Yousaf Raza Gillani where he beat PTI's incumbent finance minister, Abdul Hafeez Shaikh, by a margin of 5 votes. Although, Gillani was the opposition's joint candidate, he still did not have the required majority unless those on the treasury benches voted for him or intentionally voided their votes in the secret ballot. This fact, coupled with the leaked video of his son, led to PTI petitioning the Election Commission of Pakistan against his victory.

Meanwhile, Gurdeep Singh of the PTI, became the first Sikh to be elected to the Senate of Pakistan as he won the minority seat from Khyber Pakhtunkhwa.

Abdul Qadir, who had won as an Independent from Balochistan, later joined the PTI, increasing the tally of the party to 26 in the Senate.

References

Senate elections in Pakistan
Senate